Omotade Ojora (born 14 October 1999) is a British hurdler, who won the 110 metres hurdles events at the 2021 and 2022 British Athletics Championships. He has competed in US college athletics for USC Trojans.

Early life
Ojora was born in London on 14 October 1999. His ancestry is in the Ojora Royal Family of Lagos, and he grew up in Nigeria. He later attended Summer Fields School in Oxford from the age of 8, and Eton College. In 2015, he came third in the 100 metres hurdles event at the English Schools' Athletic Association's National Championships. In 2018, he came second in the 110 metres hurdles event at the same championships. At Eton, he also played association football and rugby union.

Career

College career
Ojora started competing for USC Trojans in 2019, and won his first two races for USC. That year, he came second in the Pac-12 Conference Championship. He won the 110 metres hurdles events at the 2019 and 2021 USC-UCLA Dual Meet, and set the USC record holder for a freshman in the event. At the 2022 NCAA Division I Outdoor Track and Field Championships, Ojora came eighth in the 110 metres hurdles event.

International career
In the United Kingdom, Ojora competes for the Windsor, Slough, Eton and Hounslow Athletic Club. Ojora won the 110 metres hurdles event at the 2021 British Athletics Championships, in a time of 13.38 seconds, which was slower than the qualification time for the delayed 2020 Summer Olympics. He was a surprise winner, as Andrew Pozzi was the favourite for the event. He was not given an Olympic wildcard place, with David King being selected instead. King had a higher world ranking, as NCAA events do not count for World Athletics ranking points. Later in 2021, he won the 110 metres hurdles event at the National Athletics League meeting in London. At the 2021 European Athletics U23 Championships, Ojora finished fourth in the final of the 110 metres hurdles, narrowly behind third placed finisher Enrique Llopis.

In 2022, Ojora defended his British title at the 2022 British Athletics Championships, in a time of 13.27 seconds. The race was run with a significant tail wind, and so Ojura could not use the time to qualify for the 2022 World Athletics Championships, and his world ranking meant that he did not qualify for the championships. Ojora was selected for the 110 metres hurdles event at the 2022 Commonwealth Games; it was his first international competition. He was eliminated in the first round.

References

External links
 

1998 births
Living people
Athletes from London
British male hurdlers
British Athletics Championships winners
USC Trojans men's track and field athletes
People educated at Eton College
People educated at Summer Fields School
British people of Nigerian descent